Wang Gao was a warlord late in the Chinese dynasty Tang Dynasty, who controlled Yiwu Circuit (義武, headquartered in modern Baoding, Hebei) after succeeding his father Wang Chucun in 895 until his defeat in 900.

Background and governance of Yiwu 

It is not known when Wang Gao was born.  His father Wang Chucun had become the military governor (Jiedushi) of Yiwu Circuit in 879, and during Wang Chucun's governance, Wang Gao became deputy military governor (副大使, Fudashi).  After Wang Chucun's death in 895, the soldiers supported Wang Gao to be acting military governor. Then-reigning Emperor Zhaozong thus commissioned him as acting military governor, and then full military governor.  In 897, Emperor Zhaozong gave Wang Gao the honorary chancellor designation Tong Zhongshu Menxia Pingzhangshi.

Defeat and flight 
In 900, the major warlord Zhu Quanzhong the military governor of Xuanwu Circuit (宣武, headquartered in modern Kaifeng, Henan), an archrival to Wang Gao's ally Li Keyong the military governor of Hedong Circuit (河東, headquartered in modern Taiyuan, Shanxi), sent his general Zhang Cunjing north to try to subdue Li Keyong's allies east of the Taihang Mountains.  After first forcing Wang Rong the military governor of Chengde Circuit (成德, headquartered in modern Shijiazhuang, Hebei) to submit, Zhang attacked Yiwu Circuit.  Wang Gao sent his uncle Wang Chuzhi to resist Zhang.  Wang Chuzhi advocated building fences to try to impede the Xuanwu army's advancement, to tire it out, before engaging the Xuanwu army.  However, the officer Liang Wen, arguing that the Yiwu army had a numerical advantage, advocated an immediate confrontation.  Wang Gao thus ordered one.  Zhang, however, crushed the Yiwu army and killed over half of its soldiers; the remaining soldiers escorted Wang Chuzhi and fled back to Yiwu's capital Ding Prefecture.

Faced with his uncle's defeat, Wang Gao fled to Hedong Circuit.  (The soldiers subsequently supported Wang Chuzhi as acting military governor, and he was able to secure a peace agreement with Zhu by agreeing to submit to Zhu.)  Li Keyong gave him an honorary post.  He died early in the Tianfu era (901–904).

Notes and references 

 Old Book of Tang, vol. 182.
 New Book of Tang, vol. 186.
 Zizhi Tongjian, vols. 260, 261, 262.

9th-century births
900s deaths
Year of birth unknown
Year of death uncertain
Tang dynasty jiedushi of Yiwu Circuit